Alexei Koznev (born October 3, 1975) is a Russian professional ice hockey Forward who currently plays for Vityaz Chekhov of the Kontinental Hockey League (KHL).

External links

1975 births
Living people
HC Vityaz players
Russian ice hockey forwards
Severstal Cherepovets players
SKA Saint Petersburg players
Avangard Omsk players
HC Sibir Novosibirsk players